Ramaswamy Venkataraman (4 December 191027 January 2009) was an Indian lawyer, Indian independence activist and politician who served as a Union Minister and as the eighth president of India.
Venkataraman was born in Rajamadam village in Tanjore district, Madras Presidency. He studied law and practised in the Madras High Court and the Supreme Court of India. In his young age, he was an activist of the Indian independence movement and participated in the Quit India Movement. He was appointed as the member of the Constituent Assembly and the provisional cabinet. He was elected to the Lok Sabha four times and served as Union Finance Minister and Defence Minister. In 1984, he was elected as the seventh vice president of India and in 1987, he became the eighth President of India and served from 1987 to 1992. He also served as a State minister under K. Kamaraj and M. Bhaktavatsalam.

Early life
Venkataraman was born during the British colonial rule in Rajamadam village near in Pattukottai, near Tanjore district in Tamil Nadu in an Iyer family. He had a close friend in Rajamadam village named as Rajamadam Kannan Iyengar. He had his school education in Govt Boys Higher Secondary School, Pattukottai & Undergraduation in National College, Tiruchirappalli.

Educated locally and in the city of Madras (now Chennai), Venkataraman obtained his master's degree in economics from Loyola College, Madras. He later qualified in Law from the Law College, Madras. Venkataraman was enrolled in the Madras High Court in 1935 and in the Supreme Court in 1951.

While practising law, Venkataraman was drawn into the movement for India's freedom from Britain's colonial subjugation. His active participation in the Indian National Congress's celebrated resistance to the British Government, the Quit India Movement of 1942, resulted in his detention for two years under the Defence of India Rules. Venkataraman's interest in the law continued during this period. In 1946, when the transfer of power from British to Indian hands was imminent, the Government of India included him in the panel of lawyers sent to Malaya and Singapore to defend Indian nationals charged with offences of collaboration during the Japanese occupation of those two places. In the years 1947 to 1950, Venkataraman served as Secretary of the Madras Provincial Bar Federation.

Political career
Law and trade activity led to Venkataraman's increasing association with politics. He was a member of constituent assembly that drafted India's constitution. In 1950, he was elected to free India's Provisional Parliament (1950–1952) and to the First Parliament (1952–1957). During his term of legislative activity, Venkataraman attended the 1952 Session of the Metal Trades Committee of International Labour Organisation as a workers' delegate. He was a member of the Indian Parliamentary Delegation to the Commonwealth Parliamentary Conference in New Zealand. Venkataraman was also Secretary to the Congress Parliamentary Party in 1953–1954.

Although re-elected to Parliament in 1957, Venkataraman resigned his seat in the Lok Sabha to join the State Government of Madras as a Minister. There Shri Venkataraman held the portfolios of Industries, Labour, Cooperation, Power, Transport and Commercial Taxes from 1957 to 1967. During this time, he was also Leader of the Upper House, namely, the Madras Legislative Council.

As Minister of Industries

Venkataraman was appointed as a Member of the Union Planning Commission in 1967 and was entrusted the subjects of Industry, Labour, power, Transport, Communications, Railways. He held that office until 1971.  In 1977, Venkataraman was elected to the Lok Sabha from Madras (South) Constituency and served as an Opposition Member of Parliament and Chairman of the Public Accounts Committee.

Venkataraman was also, variously, a member of the Political Affairs Committee and the Economic Affairs Committee of the Union Cabinet; Governor, International Monetary Fund, the International Bank for Reconstruction and Development, and the Asian Development Bank. Venkataraman was a Delegate to the United Nations General Assembly in 1953, 1955, 1956, 1958, 1959, 1960 and 1961. He was Leader of the Indian Delegation to the 42nd Session of the International Labour Conference at Geneva (1958) and represented India in the Inter Parliamentary Conference in Vienna (1978). He was a member of the United Nations Administrative Tribunal from 1955 to 1979 and was its President from 1968 to 1979.

As Minister of Defence 
In 1980, Venkataraman was re-elected to the Lok Sabha and was appointed Union Minister of Finance in the Government headed by Smt. Indira Gandhi. He was later appointed Union Minister of Defence, here he is credited for initiating India's missile programme, he shifted A P J Abdul Kalam from space programme to the missile programme, and consolidated the entire missile system, naming it as Integrated Guided Missile Development Program.

Vice President and President of India 

Later he was to serve as Vice-President of India and then as a President of India starting 1987, where he worked with four prime ministers, and appointed three of them: V. P. Singh, Chandra Shekhar and P. V. Narasimha Rao, during his five-year term, which saw the advent of coalition politics in India. His successor S. D. Sharma was the only other Indian President in 20th Century to work with four prime ministers and appoint three of them.

Honours and accolades

Venkataraman received the Doctorate of Law (Honoris Causa) from the University of Madras. He is an Honorary Fellow, Madras Medical College; a Doctor of Social Sciences, University of Roorkee; Doctor of Law (Honoris Causa) from the University of Burdwan. He was awarded The Tamra Patra for participation in the freedom struggle, the Soviet Land Prize for his travelogue on K. Kamaraj's visit to the Socialist countries. He was the recipient of a Souvenir from the Secretary-General of the United Nations for distinguished service as President of the U.N. Administrative Tribunal. The title of "Sat Seva Ratna" was conferred on him by the Sankaracharya of Kancheepuram. He was a great devotee of the Paramacharya of Kanchi.

Illness and death
On 12 January 2009, Venkataraman was admitted to the Army Hospital (Research and Referral ) with complaints of Urosepsis (sepsis caused by a urinary tract infection). His condition grew critical on 20 January, when he was detected with low blood pressure and E. coli tract infection.

Venkataraman died at the Army Hospital (was Research and Referral) New Delhi on 27 January 2009 at 14:30 IST due to multiple organ failure at the age of 98. Since he died on the day after Republic Day, some programmes coinciding it were cancelled to mark the respect towards the late former President. He was cremated with full state honours at Ekta Sthal near Raj Ghat. President Pratibha Patil, Vice President Mohammad Hamid Ansari, Prime Minister Manmohan Singh and various other leaders condoled his death.

Books by Venkataraman
 Role of Planning in Industrial Development, by Ramaswami Venkataraman. Published by Govt. of India Press, 1969.
 The Role of a Private Member of Parliament, by Ramaswami Venkataraman. Published by Harold Laski Institute of Political Science, 1986.
 My Presidential Years – R Venkataraman, by R Venkataraman. 1995. HarperCollins/Indus. .
 R. Venkataraman on Contemporary Issues, by Ramaswami Venkataraman, K. Venkatasubramanian. Published by Variant Communications, 1996.
 Relevance of Gandhi: And Other Essays, by K Swaminathan, Ramaswami Venkataraman. Published by Gandhigram Trust, 1998.

Books on Venkataraman
 President R. Venkataraman, by Nand Gopal Chaudhry. Published by Manas Publications, 1987. .
 The Great Humanist Ramaswami Venkataraman, by Attar Chand. Published by Gian Pub. House, 1987. .
 So May India be Great: Selected Speeches and Writings of President R. Venkataraman, by Ramaswami Venkataraman. Published by Publication Division, Ministry of Information and Broadcasting, Govt. of India, 1990.
 Selected Speeches, 1984–87, 10 September 1984 – 14 May 1987, by Ramaswami Venkataraman. Published by Publications Division, Ministry of Information and Broadcasting, Govt. of India, 1991.
 President R. Venkataraman Selected Speeches: July 1987 – December 1989.'', by Ramaswami Venkataraman. Published by Publications Division, Ministry of Information and Broadcasting, Govt. of India, 1991.

References

Further reading

External links

 
 

1910 births
2009 deaths
India MPs 1952–1957
Loyola College, Chennai alumni
Deaths from multiple organ failure
Defence Ministers of India
Finance Ministers of India
Indian autobiographers
Indian independence activists from Tamil Nadu
20th-century Indian lawyers
Indian National Congress politicians from Tamil Nadu
20th-century Indian essayists
Members of the Constituent Assembly of India
People from Thanjavur district
Presidents of India
Tamil Nadu ministers
University of Madras alumni
Union Ministers from Tamil Nadu
Vice presidents of India
Lok Sabha members from Tamil Nadu
India MPs 1957–1962
India MPs 1977–1979
India MPs 1980–1984
20th-century Indian biographers
Indian technology writers
Indian political writers
20th-century Indian non-fiction writers
National College, Tiruchirappalli alumni
Politicians from Chennai
People of the Sri Lankan Civil War
Indian Peace Keeping Force